Tacca may refer to:

People
 Ferdinando Tacca (1619-1686) Italian architect
 Giuseppe Tacca (1917-1984) Italian-French pro-cyclist
 Pierre Tacca, French pro-cyclist, see List of teams and cyclists in the 1950 Tour de France
 Pietro Tacca (1577-1640) Italian sculptor

Other uses
 Tacca, a genus of flowering plants, including batflowers and arrowroot
 TACCA, a type of U.S. Army bandolier, see List of U.S. Army munitions by supply catalog designation
 Tacca Musique (Tacca), a Canadian record label, part of Aquarius Records (Canada)

See also
 Taqa (disambiguation)
 Taka (disambiguation)
 TACA (disambiguation)